Leucoptera phaeopasta is a moth in the Lyonetiidae family that is known from Australia and was described from Queensland.

They probably mine the leaves of their host plant.

External links

Leucoptera (moth)
Moths described in 1923
Endemic fauna of Australia
Moths of Australia